Paurocoris is a genus of dirt-colored seed bugs in the family Rhyparochromidae. There are at least two described species in Paurocoris.

Species
These two species belong to the genus Paurocoris:
 Paurocoris punctata (Distant, 1893)
 Paurocoris wygodzinskyi Slater, 1980

References

Rhyparochromidae
Articles created by Qbugbot